American hip hop duo Capone-N-Noreaga have released five studio albums, one compilation album, two mixtapes, sixteen singles and five music videos.

Albums

Studio albums

Compilation albums

Mixtapes

Singles

As lead artist

As featured artist

Guest appearances

Music videos

Notes

References

External links
 
 
 

Discographies of American artists
Hip hop discographies